Irene Greenwood  (9 December 1898 — 14 April 1992) was an Australian radio broadcaster and feminist and peace activist.

Early life and education
Greenwood was born in Albany, Western Australia on 9 December 1898. She was the oldest child of Henry Driver and Mary Ann Driver née Hicken. Greenwood attended Albany State School between 1905 and 1912 and Perth Modern School between 1913 and 1917. She then went on to study arts at the University of Western Australia.

Later life and career
Driver worked as a secretary at the Department of Agriculture between 1918 and 1920 where she met her husband, Albert Ernest Greenwood, an accountant. They married on 18 June 1920 at the Anglican Church of the Annunciation in Broome, Western Australia.

Between 1931 and 1935, Greenwood worked as a broadcaster in Sydney before moving to Perth to run regular radio programmes, several of which centered around women. Greenwood retired from radio broadcasting in 1953.

Greenwood became involved in feminist and peace movements through her mother who was involved with the Woman’s Christian Temperance Union and the Australian Federation of Women Voters.

She took part in Perth's first strike by civil servants in 1920. While working as a broadcaster, many of her programs were centred around her political and feminist beliefs. Her involvement in feminist and peace movements increased after she retired from radio. During the 1960s and 1970s, she became a delegate to national conferences and forums and worked with the Women's International League for Peace and Freedom until she was in her seventies. She was also involved with the foundation of the Family Planning Association in Western Australia and the Abortion Law Repeal Association.

Before her death on 14 April 1992, Greenwood donated the majority of her radio transcripts, books, journals, personal correspondence and her papers from the organisations which she was involved with to the Murdoch University library.

Awards and recognition
Greenwood received several awards through her work in feminist and peace movements. She was awarded with the United Nations Association of Australia Silver Peace Medal; Queen's Silver Jubilee Medal; had a ship, M.V. Irene Greenwood, named after her; and in 1974 was appointed to the National Advisory Committee on Women's Affairs. She was also the first woman to receive an Honorary Degree from Murdoch University. In 1975 she was made a Member of the Order of Australia for her "service to women's welfare".

In 2005 a biography by Kaye Murray, Voice for Peace: The spirit of social activist Irene Greenwood (1898-1992), was published.

See also
List of peace activists

References

1898 births
1992 deaths
People educated at Perth Modern School
University of Western Australia alumni
Australian radio personalities
Australian women radio presenters
Australian women's rights activists
Australian women activists
People from Albany, Western Australia
Members of the Order of Australia